Scott Krippayne (born July 23, 1970) is an American singer and songwriter. Krippayne is better known for his contributions towards other artists, as over 150 of his songs have been recorded by others including Point of Grace, John Tesh, Avalon, Jaci Velasquez, FFH, True Vibe and Sandi Patty.

In 2007, he wrote the song "This Is My Now", which was chosen as the coronation song for the final of American Idol Season Six sung by the Top 2 Jordin Sparks and Blake Lewis. In 2014, Krippayne received a Daytime Emmy nomination for writing the theme music on PAW Patrol. Krippayne has also authored two books; Hugs for Teens and More Than a Story.

Discography

Albums

Singles 

 "In the House" (2019), with Felicia Barton for 101 Dalmatian Street

References

External links
 

Living people
Musicians from Seattle
1971 births
Singer-songwriters from Washington (state)